Bulgaria women's national goalball team is the women's national team of Bulgaria.  Goalball is a team sport designed specifically for athletes with a vision impairment.  The team takes part in international competitions.

Regional championships 

The team can compete in the IBSA Europe goalball region. 

The 1985 European Championships were held in Olsztyn, Poland with six teams competing.  The team finished sixth.

See also 

 Disabled sports 
 Bulgaria at the Paralympics

References

Goalball women's
National women's goalball teams
Bulgaria at the Paralympics
European national goalball teams